Luca Romagnoli (born 12 September 1961 in Rome) is an Italian politician and former Member of the European Parliament for Southern Italy with the neo-fascist party Tricolour Flame, being a Non-Inscrit (for a short time, ITS group member) in the European Parliament.

He sat on its Committee on Transport and Tourism, and was a substitute for the Committee on Employment and Social Affairs and a member of the Delegation for relations with Mercosur.

On 8 November 2013, Luca Romagnoli, secretary of Tricolour Flame, together with the secretary of The Right Francesco Storace, the regent of Future and Freedom Roberto Menia, the leader of I the South Adriana Poli Bortone, Domenico Nania of the association New Alliance, Oreste Tofani of the association Nazione Sovrana, Antonio Buonfiglio of the association Il Popolo della Vita and Roberto Buonasorte, editor of the online newspaper Il Giornale d'Italia, founded the Movement for National Alliance, a federation of right movements inspired to National Alliance.
On 9 December 2013 the Central Committee of Tricolour Flame distrusted Luca Romagnoli, because he joined this initiative without having preventively sought the opinion of the same Committee.

Following the expulsion from Tricolour Flame, Romagnoli founded his new political movement, Social Right.

Education
 1989: Graduate in geography (University of Rome La Sapienza)

Career
 1989-1990: worked as a researcher for Oceansismica S.p.A.
 carried out research at the University of Maputo in Mozambique (1991) and Trinity College, Dublin
 1990-1993: research doctorate in geography
 researcher at the Department of Human Geography of the Faculty of Letters and Philosophy of 'La Sapienza' University, Rome
 2004: associate professor in the scientific disciplinary sector of geography
 Carried out research in the context of professional collaboration with
 Pio V Institute of Political Studies, the Ministry of Labour and Censuses
 2002-2013: National Secretary of the Tricolour Flame
 Author of numerous articles, scientific articles and reviews

See also
2004 European Parliament election in Italy

References 

Article referring to an interview to the Italian edition of Sky TV.

External links
  
 
 

1961 births
Living people
Politicians from Rome
Italian neo-fascists
Tricolour Flame MEPs
MEPs for Italy 2004–2009
21st-century Italian politicians
Tricolour Flame politicians